Lost Lad is a hill,  high on the Derwent Edge in the Peak District in the county of Derbyshire in England. It is a subpeak of Back Tor.

Description 

Lost Lad is a bare, conical moorland summit and subpeak of the nearby Back Tor which rises about 600 metres to the southeast. The top of Lost Lad is marked by a cairn and toposcope and there are good views over the surrounding northern Peak District.

Name 
Lost Lad is actually the name of the cairn at the top, whose name refers to a legend about a shepherd boy from the lost village of Derwent. According to the legend the boy became lost on the moors in a blizzard and died. His body was found the following spring by a passing shepherd and nearby were the words "Lost Lad" written on a rock.

References 

Mountains and hills of the Peak District
Mountains and hills of Derbyshire